Indonesia participated at the 2017 Summer Universiade, in Taipei, Taiwan with 52 competitors in 9 sports.

Competitors
The following table lists Indonesia's delegation per sport and gender.

Medallists

References

2017 in Indonesian sport
Nations at the 2017 Summer Universiade
Indonesia at the Summer Universiade